This is a list of notable films produced in the country of Armenia.

Before 1920s
 List of Armenian films before 1920

1920s
 List of Armenian films of the 1920s

1930s
 List of Armenian films of the 1930s

1940s
 List of Armenian films of the 1940s

1950s
 List of Armenian films of the 1950s

1960s
 List of Armenian films of the 1960s

1970s
 List of Armenian films of the 1970s

1980s
 List of Armenian films of the 1980s

1990s
 List of Armenian films of the 1990s

2000s
 List of Armenian films of the 2000s

2010s
 List of Armenian films of the 2010s

2020s
 List of Armenian films of the 2020s

References

External links
 Armenian film at the Internet Movie Database
 Armenian cinema